2-Pyrrolidone, also known as 2-pyrrolidinone or butyrolactam, is an organic compound consisting of a 5-membered lactam, making it the simplest γ-lactam.  It is a colorless liquid that is miscible with water and most common organic solvents.

2-Pyrrolidone itself and various derivatives made from it have a variety of industrial uses.

Production
2-Pyrrolidone is produced industrially almost exclusively by treating aqueous gamma-butyrolactone with ammonia at a temperature of 250–290 °C and pressures ranging from 0.4–1.4 MPa over solid magnesium silicate catalysts.

The reaction is carried out in a tubular reactor which is packed with the solid catalyst. The latter is arranged as a fixed bed and the reaction is carried out in the vapor phase. Product yields of 75–85% are reached. After subsequent distillation and purification, the desired 2-pyrrolidone is obtained with a purity of 99.5%.

Alternative routes include the catalytic or electrochemical reduction of succinimide, the carbonylation of allylamine, the hydrogenation of succinonitrile under hydrolytic conditions and the reaction of maleic or succinic anhydride in aqueous ammonia with Pd–Ru-catalysts.

In 2010, the worldwide demand for 2-pyrrolidone was estimated to be 32.000 t. Important manufacturers of 2-pyrrolidone are BASF and ISP (International Speciality Products, now Ashland Inc.).

Uses
2-Pyrrolidone itself is used in inkjet cartridges.

A variety of pharmaceutical drugs are 2-pyrrolidone derivatives, including cotinine, doxapram, povidone, and ethosuximide, and the racetams.

The chemical is an intermediate in the production of the polyvinylpyrrolidone precursor vinylpyrrolidone and the solvent N-methylpyrrolidone (NMP).

Safety
2-Pyrrolidone is an eye irritant.

References

External links

Amide solvents